Ewing Hunter Harrison (November 7, 1944 – December 16, 2017) was a railway executive who served as the CEO of Illinois Central Railroad (IC), Canadian National Railway (CN), Canadian Pacific Railway (CP), and CSX Corporation. He died on December 16, 2017, two days after taking medical leave from CSX. He is known for introducing precision scheduled railroading to the companies he ran.

Biography

Born in Memphis, Tennessee, in 1944, Harrison began his railroad career in 1964 when he worked as a carman-oiler for the St. Louis-San Francisco Railway ("Frisco"), while attending Memphis State University. Harrison was later promoted to railroad operator with Frisco and, later, with Burlington Northern Railroad (BN) following that company's acquisition of Frisco in 1980. Harrison was consistently promoted at BN, eventually being appointed vice-president – transportation as well as vice-president – service design.

Harrison left the BN in 1989 and secured a job with the executive team at the Illinois Central Railroad (IC), first as vice-president and chief operating officer, culminating with his appointment as president and chief executive officer from 1993 to 1998. Following the acquisition of IC by CN in 1998, Harrison was appointed vice-president and chief operating officer by CN. Upon the retirement of Paul Tellier, he was appointed president and chief executive officer of CN on January 1, 2003, serving in that position until his retirement on December 31, 2009. 

During his time at CN, Harrison was named Railroader of the Year for 2002 by industry trade journal Railway Age as well as CEO of the Year for 2007 by The Globe and Mail's "Report on Business". On April 29, 2009, CN announced the company's plan for succession in Harrison's position by appointing Claude Mongeau as his successor effective January 1, 2010. Following his service at CN, Harrison retired to his estate in Connecticut where he raised and trained horses for show jumping. Bound by a non-competition clause with CN, Harrison maintained a low profile serving as a director for the Belt Railway of Chicago as well as Dynegy Holdings LLC. 

In fall 2011, Harrison was approached by the hedge fund Pershing Square Capital Management led by activist investor Bill Ackman, who was undertaking a proxy battle with the board of directors of CPR.  Ackman had offered at that time to appoint Harrison as president and chief executive officer of CPR should his proxy battle in spring 2012 be successful, which would necessarily result in the termination of Fred Green as president and CEO. Ackman was ultimately successful in the proxy battle at the CPR's annual shareholder meeting on May 17, 2012. On June 29, 2012, Harrison was appointed president and CEO of CPR.

CN halted nearly $40-million in benefits to be paid to Harrison after launching a lawsuit alleging he may have breached, or intended to breach, several confidentiality agreements with the railway dating back to his retirement in 2009. In the suit, CN's board of directors said it had grounds to believe Harrison may have violated his commitments to CN as part of push by activist shareholder William Ackman and his New York-based hedge fund, Pershing Capital Management LLC, to see Harrison replace Fred Green as CEO of rival CP Ltd.

On January 18, 2017, Harrison abruptly resigned as CEO of CP Ltd. Instead, he joined Paul Hilal in involving himself in the management of CSX Corp., a US competitor. 
On March 7, 2017, Harrison was named CEO of CSX.

Harrison died on December 16, 2017, due to severe complications from a recent illness, two days after taking medical leave from CSX. He was 73 and survived by his wife, Jeannie, and two daughters, Elizabeth (Libby) Julo and Cayce Judge.

References

Further reading

1944 births
2017 deaths
Businesspeople from Tennessee
Canadian Pacific Railway executives
Canadian National Railway executives
Illinois Central Railroad people
20th-century American railroad executives
21st-century American railroad executives
People from Memphis, Tennessee
American chief operating officers
American chief executives